Michael & Me is an independent, self-financed 2005 American documentary film created by Los Angeles-based radio and television talk show host Larry Elder. The direct-to-DVD documentary attempts to disprove statements made by filmmaker Michael Moore in his 2002 documentary film Bowling for Columbine about the relationship between American culture, gun ownership and increased violence.  The documentary mirrors Moore's landmark 1989 documentary, Roger & Me, in tone and interview style.  The film is frequently presented at conservative film festivals.

Overview
In Michael & Me, Elder interviews people who have used guns to prevent becoming a victim of crime to provide evidence that an armed society is a safer society.  For example, Elder interviews a woman identified as "Jane Doe," a real estate agent who was raped by a client. Elder states that the victim "would have been able to protect herself" were she armed.

Production notes
In an August 2005 interview on Hannity & Colmes, Elder stated that he took out a home equity loan to finance the documentary's estimated $350,000 budget.

References

External links 
 

2004 films
2004 documentary films
American documentary films
Direct-to-video documentary films
Films about Michael Moore
2000s English-language films
American independent films
2004 independent films
2000s American films